Wednesbury is a market town in Sandwell in the county of West Midlands, England. It is located near the source of the River Tame. Historically part of Staffordshire in the Hundred of Offlow, at the 2011 Census the town had a population of 37,817.

History

Medieval and earlier

The substantial remains of a large ditch excavated in St Mary's Road in 2008, following the contours of the hill and predating the Early Medieval period, has been interpreted as part of a hilltop enclosure and possibly the Iron Age hillfort long suspected on the site. The first authenticated spelling of the name was Wodensbyri, written in an endorsement on the back of the copy of the will of Wulfric Spot, dated 1004. Wednesbury ("Woden's borough") is one of the few places in England to be named after a pre-Christian deity.

During the Anglo-Saxon period there are believed to have been two battles fought in Wednesbury, in 592 and 715. According to The Anglo-Saxon Chronicle there was "a great slaughter" in 592 and "Ceawlin was driven out". Ceawlin was a king of Wessex and the second Bretwalda, or overlord of all Britain. The 715 battle was between Mercia (of which Wednesbury was part) and the kingdom of Wessex. Both sides allegedly claimed to have won the battle, although it is believed that the victory inclined to Wessex.

Wednesbury was fortified by Æthelflæd (Ethelfleda), daughter of Alfred the Great and known as the Lady of Mercia. She erected five fortifications to defend against the Danes at Bridgnorth, Tamworth, Stafford and Warwick, with Wednesbury in the centre. Wednesbury's fort would probably have been an extension of an older fortification and made of a stone foundation with a wooden stockade above. Earthwork ramparts and water filled ditches would probably have added to its strength. A plaque on the gardens between Ethelfleda Terrace and St Bartholomew's church states that the gardens there – created in the 1950s – used stone from the graff, or fighting platform, of the old fort. Exploration of the gardens reveals several dressed stones, which appear to be those referred to on the plaque.

In 1086, the Domesday Book describes Wednesbury (Wadnesberie) as being a thriving rural community encompassing Bloxwich and Shelfield (now part of Walsall). During the Middle Ages the town was a rural village, with each family farming a strip of land with nearby heath being used for grazing. The town was held by the king until the reign of Henry II, when it passed to the Heronville family. 

Medieval Wednesbury was very small, and its inhabitants would appear to have been farmers and farm workers. In 1315, coal pits were first recorded, which led to an increase in the number of jobs. Nail making was also in progress during these times. William Paget was born in Wednesbury in 1505, the son of a nail maker. He became Secretary of State, a Knight of the Garter and an Ambassador. He was one of executors of the will of Henry VIII.

Post-Medieval

In the 17th century Wednesbury pottery – "Wedgbury ware" – was being sold as far away as Worcester, while white clay from Monway Field was used to make tobacco pipes.

By the 18th century the main occupations were coal mining and nail making. With the introduction of the first turnpike road in 1727 and the development of canals and later the railways came a big increase in population. In 1769 the canal banks were soon full of factories as in this year, the first Birmingham Canal was cut to link Wednesbury's coalfields to the Birmingham industries.

In 1743 the Wesleys and their new Methodist movement were severely tested. Early in the year, John and Charles Wesley preached in the open air on the Tump. They were warmly received and made welcome by the vicar. Soon afterwards another preacher came and was rude about the current state of the Anglican clergy. This angered the vicar, and the magistrates published a notice ordering that any further preachers were to be brought to them. When Wesley next came his supporters were still there but a crowd of others heckled him and threw stones. Later the crowd came to his lodgings and took him to the magistrates, but they declined to have anything to do with Wesley or the crowd. The crowd ill-treated Wesley and nearly killed him but he remained calm. Eventually they came to their senses and returned him to his hosts.

Soon afterward the vicar asked his congregation to pledge not to associate with Methodists, and some who refused to pledge had their windows smashed. Others who hosted Methodist meetings had the contents of their houses destroyed. This terrible episode came to an end in December when the vicar died. After that mainstream Anglican and Methodist relations were generally cordial. Methodism grew strongly and Wesley visited often, almost until his death. Francis Asbury, Richard Whatcoat and the Earl of Dartmouth are among those who attended Methodist meetings, all to have a profound effect on the United States.

A steam tram service opened to Dudley, also serving Tipton, on 21 January 1884. The line was electrified in 1907 but discontinued in March 1930 on its replacement by Midland Red buses.

Wednesbury was incorporated as a municipal borough, with its headquarters at Wednesbury Town Hall, in 1886, maintaining this status for 80 years until it was absorbed into an expanded borough of West Bromwich in 1966.

In 1887, Brunswick Park was opened to celebrate Queen Victoria's Golden Jubilee.

20th and 21st centuries

On the evening of 31 January 1916, Wednesbury was hit by one of the first wave of German Zeppelins aimed at Britain during the First World War. Joseph Smith and his three children were killed in their house in the King Street area. His wife survived, having left the house to investigate the cause of a loud noise at a nearby factory, caused by the first bombs falling.

The first council houses in Wednesbury were built in the early 1920s, but progress was slow compared to nearby towns including Tipton and West Bromwich. By 1930, a mere 206 families had been rehoused from slums. However, the building of council houses rose dramatically at the start of the 1930s, the 1,000th council house being occupied before the end of 1931. By 1935, some 1,250 older houses had been demolished or earmarked for demolition. By 1944 there were more than 3,000 council properties; by 1959, more than 5,000; the largest development in Wednesbury being the Hateley Heath estate in the late 1940s and early 1950s, which straddled the border of Wednesbury and West Bromwich.

In 1947, the Corporation granted a licence for the operation of a cinema, on the condition that no children under 15 were to be admitted on Sundays. The cinema operator challenged this decision in court, claiming that the imposition of the condition was outside the corporation's powers. The court used this case to establish a general test for overturning the decision of a public body in this type of case, which is now known as "Wednesbury unreasonableness".

The borough of Wednesbury ceased to exist in 1966, with the majority being absorbed into West Bromwich, and small parts in the County Borough of Walsall. These changes saw the Dangerfield Lane estate (developed during the interwar and early postwar years) being absorbed into Darlaston (now part of an expanded Walsall borough), while the Wednesbury section of Hateley Heath was absorbed into West Bromwich township, and Wednesbury township gained the Friar Park estate from West Bromwich township. West Bromwich amalgamated with Warley in 1974 to form the present-day borough of Sandwell. Wednesbury has the postcode WS10, shared with Darlaston in the borough of Walsall.

During the 1970s and 1980s, Wednesbury's traditional industry declined and unemployment rose, but since 1990 new developments such as a new light industrial estate, a retail park and the pedestrian-only Union Street have given a new look to the town. The traditional market is still a feature of the bustling centre, and the streets around Market Place are now a protected conservation area.

In the late 1980s, a section of land near junction 9 of the M6 motorway was designated as the location for a new retail development. The first retailer to move onto the site was Swedish furniture retailer Ikea, who opened their superstore in January 1991. Throughout the 1990s, the retail park expanded to include several more large units, although most of these were empty by 2009 due to the recession. However, most of the units were occupied again by 2012 and the retail park is now home to retailers including Next (which opened in November 2005), TK Maxx, Boots, Curry's, B&Q and B&M. When the original Curry's store opened in 1995, it was the largest electrical superstore in Europe.

The retail park was expanded in 2017 with the construction of more retail units and eateries, while the existing car park was remodelled to create more parking spaces.

Wednesbury was also the scene of two major tragedies during the second half of the 20th century. On 21 December 1977, four siblings aged between 4 and 12 years died in a house fire in School Road, Friar Park, at the height of the national firefighters strike. The house was demolished soon afterwards, leaving a gap in a terrace of council houses. On 24 September 1984, four pupils and a teacher from Stuart Bathurst RC High School were killed when their minibus was struck by a roll of steel which fell from the back of a lorry, on Wood Green Road close to the park keepers house.

For well over 100 years, Wednesbury was dominated by the huge Patent Shaft steel works, which opened during the 19th century on a site straddling the border with Tipton, and closed in 1980. The factory was demolished in 1983, and within a decade had been developed for light industry and services. The iron gates of the factory are still in existence and were later mounted on the traffic island at Holyhead Road and Dudley Street.

The town's current bus station was opened in the autumn of 2004 on the site of its predecessor.

In 2003, Wednesbury Museum and Art Gallery staged Stuck in Wednesbury, the first show in a public gallery of the Stuckism international art movement.

Morrisons opened a supermarket in the town centre on 4 November 2007, creating some 350 new jobs. A number of council bungalows had been demolished, along with a section of the town centre shops, to make way for it.

The archives for Wednesbury Borough are held at Sandwell Community History and Archives Service in Smethwick.

Oakeswell Hall
Second in importance to Wednesbury manor house was Oakeswell Hall, built c. 1421 by William Byng. The property descended to the family of Jennyns.  By 1662 the house was known as Okeswell or Hopkins New Hall Place (it being adjacent to the Hopkins family's New Hall Fields). Richard Parkes, a Quaker ironmaster, bought it in 1707 and moved in the following year. During the late 18th and early 19th centuries it was a farmhouse. Between 1825 and 1962 it had several different owners, including Joseph Smith (the first town clerk) who greatly restored it. In 1962 it was demolished.

Dr Walter Chancellor Garman (1860–1923), a general practitioner, and his wife, Margaret Frances Magill lived at Oakeswell Hall. Their children included the Garman sisters who were associated with the Bloomsbury group. There were nine children, seven sisters and two brothers: Mary (1898), Sylvia (1899), Kathleen (1901), Douglas (1903), Rosalind (1904), Helen (1906), Mavin (1907), Ruth (1909) and Lorna (1911).

Roads
Wednesbury is on Thomas Telford's London to Holyhead road, built in the early 19th century. The section between Wednesbury and Moxley was widened in 1997 to form a dual carriageway, completing the Black Country Spine Road that had been in development since 1995 when the route between Wednesbury and West Bromwich had opened, along with a one-mile route to the north of Moxley linking with the Black Country Route. The original plan was for a completely new route between Wednesbury and Moxley, but this was abandoned as part of cost-cutting measures, as were the planned grade-separated junctions, which were abandoned in favour of conventional roundabouts.

The bus station, rebuilt in 2004, is in the town centre near the swimming baths with links to Wolverhampton, West Bromwich, Walsall and Dudley where connections can be made to the Merry Hill Shopping Centre.  The previous direct link to Merry Hill was withdrawn due traffic congestion as was the direct link to Birmingham.

Railways

Wednesbury was first connected to the rail network in the mid-19th century, and has been served by heavy and light rail for all but six years since then.

Since 1999, Wednesbury has been served by the West Midlands Metro light rail (tram) system, with stops at Great Western Street and Wednesbury Parkway. The maintenance depot is also here. It runs from Wolverhampton to Birmingham, and the line for a proposed extension to Brierley Hill is currently being cleared ready for the new track bed and electrification. It will use sections of the South Staffordshire Line alongside freight traffic which will run from Walsall to Brierley Hill via Wednesbury Town and Dudley but freight traffic may start later than the metro due to relaying of the track and assessing the space required for the joint line to work. It may also be used by tram-trains which can run on heavy rail.

The South Staffordshire Line between Walsall and Stourbridge served Wednesbury until 1993. Passenger services were withdrawn after Wednesbury railway station closed in 1964 under the Beeching Axe, but a steel terminal soon opened on the site and did not close until December 1992, with the railway closing on 19 March 1993 after serving the town for some 150 years.

Until 1972, the town was served by the Great Western Railway between Birmingham and Wolverhampton at Wednesbury Central station. Passenger trains were withdrawn at this time, with Wednesbury-Birmingham section of the line through West Bromwich closing. The Bilston-Wolverhampton section survived for another decade before closing over the winter of 1982/83. The final section between Wednesbury and Bilston, serving a scrapyard at Bilston, remained open until 30 August 1992, before the line was closed to allow for the creation of the Midland Metro, which opened in May 1999.

Wednesbury's rail links are set to improve further by the end of 2023 with the completion of a new Metro line running to Brierley Hill via Tipton and Dudley, making use of the disused South Staffordshire Line.

Districts
 Church Hill, near the town centre, is notable for being the location of St Bartholomew's Church.
 Brunswick, to the immediate north of the town centre, was mostly built at the start of the 20th century around Brunswick Park.
 Friar Park, was originally in West Bromwich, and was built in the late 1920s and early 1930s.
 Myvod Estate, approximately one mile to the north of the town centre towards the border with Walsall, was built in the 1920s as Wednesbury's first major council housing development.
 Wood Green, situated around the A461 road northwards in the direction of Walsall. Landmarks include Stuart Bathurst RC High School, and on the opposite site of the road is Wood Green Academy. Since 1990, a large retail development has sprung upon around Wood Green, extending to the site of the former FH Lloyd steel plant in Park Lane.
 Golf Links, mostly built in the 1940s and 1950s with both private and council housing, in the south of the town.
 Woods Estate, to the north-east of the town centre, was built mostly as council housing between 1930 and 1962.

Wards
 Wednesbury North : Wednesbury Central, Wood Green & Old Park 
 Wednesbury South : Hill Top, Leabrook, Golf Links, Millfields, Harvills Hawthorn
 Friar Park : Woods & Mesty Croft, Friar Park and The Priory Primary

Schools

 Park Hill Primary School
 St Mary’s Roman Catholic Primary School
 Old Park Primary School
 St John's Primary Academy
 Stuart Bathurst Catholic High School
 Wodensborough Ormiston Academy
 Wood Green Academy
 Mesty Croft Academy

Notable natives/residents

Jon Brookes, drummer for The Charlatans
Bill Chambers, footballer, served as inside forward with Halifax Town and Chester City
John Cooper, footballer, played with Southampton in the 1920s
Roy Cross, footballer, played for Port Vale in the early 1970s and transferred to Nuneaton Borough in 1975
James Currier, footballer, striker for Bolton Wanderers
Norman Deeley, footballer, Wolverhampton Wanderers 1951–62
The Garman Sisters, members of the Bloomsbury Group, lived at Oakeswell Hall in the early 20th century
Syd Gibbons, footballer
Dennis Harper, footballer, Birmingham City, 1956–57
Moses Haughton the elder, 18th century engraver, designer and painter
Moses Haughton the younger, late 18th and early 19th century engraver and portraitist
Alan Hinton, footballer, Derby County, Nottingham Forest and Wolverhampton Wanderers, 1960s–70s
Marty Hogan, baseball player and manager
David Howarth, politician and Member of Parliament
John Ashley Kilvert, became mayor, after surviving the Charge of the Light Brigade
Kevin Laffan, playwright and screenwriter
Alex Lester, BBC Radio 2 broadcaster
Wilson Lloyd, late 19th century Conservative political leader who sat in the House of Commons
Len Moorwood, footballer, goalkeeper for teams including West Bromwich Albion and Burnley in the early 20th century
William Paget, 16th century English statesman
Charles Partridge, footballer, goalkeeper for Small Heath in the 1890s
Lee Payne, bassist
Ernest Perry, played for Stoke City and Port Vale
Thomas Slater Price FRS FRSE, chemist
Roy Proverbs, former professional football player
Sir Kevin Satchwell, educationalist
Fred Shinton, footballer, West Bromwich Albion, Leicester City, and Bolton Wanderers.
Dr Karl Shuker, zoologist, cryptozoologist and author
Henry Treece, poet and novelist
Tom Troman (1914–2000), cricketer
Billy Walker, footballer who played for Aston Villa and was later manager of Nottingham Forest's FA Cup winning side in 1959
Richard Wattis, character actor
Jean E. Williams (1876–1975), composer
Richard Whatcoat (1736–1806), Methodist Bishop

Notable employers

Former
Patent Shaft (part of the Cammel Laird group) steelworks was erected on land off Leabrook Road near the border with Tipton in 1840, serving the town for 140 years before its closure on 17 April 1980 – an early casualty of the recession. Demolition of the site took place in 1983.

Metro Cammell (Metropolitan Company) set up business after acquiring all of the assets of the Patent Shaft in 1902, in 1919 Vickers ltd acquired the shares of The Metropolitan Company ltd, in 1929 Vickers ltd and Cammel laird and Co merged their interests to form The Metropolitan Cammel Carriage and Wagon works Co ltd, where it produced railway coach bodies, turntables, Bridges, railway wagons and pressings at the Old Park works. The plant remained opened until 1964. The work and its workers were transferred to the Washwood heath works Birmingham.

The site was sold to The Rubbery Owen group.

F.H. Lloyd steelworks was formed at a site on Park Lane near the boundaries with Walsall and Darlaston during the 1880s, and provided employment for some 100 years. However, F.H. Lloyd was hit hard by the economic problems of the 1970s and early 1980s, and went out of business in 1982. Triplex Iron Foundry of Tipton then took the site over, but the new owners kept the factory open for just six years and it was then sold to Swedish home products company IKEA in 1988, being demolished almost immediately to make way for the superstore, which opened in January 1991.

Current
IKEA purchased the former F.H. Lloyd steel plant from Triplex in 1988, and opened one of its first British stores on the site in January 1991, just 14 months after the development had been given the go-ahead.

Property developers J.J. Gallagher had purchased the bulk of the Lloyd site in 1988 and once mineshafts were filled in, decontamination was completed the land was suitable for mass retail development. A Cargo Club supermarket-style retail warehouse, part of the Nurdin and Peacock group, opened in July 1994. It was one of three Cargo Club stores in Britain, and the venture was not a success: by the end of 1995 it had been shut down following heavy losses. A B&Q DIY superstore opened on the site in 1997.

The next two units were opened in 1995 and let to Currys and PC World, and a Burger King fast food restaurant opened opposite. By this stage the area was known as Gallagher Retail Park and incorporated the nearby Ikea and Cargo Club stores.

A further phase was completed in 2000, with Furniture Village, Furnitureland and ScS, while Currys moved to a new store in this phase (the largest electrical superstore in Europe on its completion) and their original unit was re-let to furniture retailer MFI, who remained there until the business went into liquidation eight years later. Pizza Hut and KFC opened fast food restaurants in 2002.

Next and later TK Maxx, Outfit, Boots and Mamas & Papas opened in the refurbished phase next to Currys after they moved to the site, with the Next store being the first unit to open in this phase in late 2005. Both Currys and PC World are now known as 'Megastores'.

In 2016, successful German supermarket chain Lidl opened a new distribution centre just off Wood Green Road, on land near Junction 9 Retail Park.

New stores, including a Marks and Spencer Simply Food supermarket, Nandos, Smash Burger and Costa are due to open in 2017.

Quantum print and packaging Limited employs 30 people since relocating to Wednesbury in 2013 from their Willenhall base.
The Factory occupies a 30000 sq ft site in the town centre

Cock-fighting ballad
A ballad about cock-fighting in the town called "Wedgebury Cocking" or "Wednesbury Cocking" became well known in the 19th century. It begins:

 At Wednesbury there was a cocking,
A match between Newton and Skrogging;

The colliers and nailers left work,

And all to Spittles' went jogging

To see this noble sport.

Many noted men there resorted,

And though they'd but little money,

Yet that they freely sported.

References

 
Towns in the West Midlands (county)
History of Methodism
Hill forts in the West Midlands (county)
Anglo-Saxon paganism